The 2017 Icelandic Cup, also known as Borgunarbikar for sponsorship reasons, was the 58th edition of the Icelandic national football cup. The winners were ÍBV after beating FH 1-0 in the final.

Calendar
Below are the dates for each round as given by the official schedule:

First round

|colspan="3" style="background-color:#97DEFF"|17 April 2017

|-
|colspan="3" style="background-color:#97DEFF"|21 April 2017

|-
|colspan="3" style="background-color:#97DEFF"|22 April 2017

|-
|colspan="3" style="background-color:#97DEFF"|23 April 2017

|-
|colspan="3" style="background-color:#97DEFF"|24 April 2017

|}

Second round

|colspan="3" style="background-color:#97DEFF"|27 April 2017

|-
|colspan="3" style="background-color:#97DEFF"|28 April 2017

|-
|colspan="3" style="background-color:#97DEFF"|29 April 2017

|-
|colspan="3" style="background-color:#97DEFF"|30 April 2017

|}

Round of 32

The Round of 32 will be played 16–18 May 2017.

Round of 16

The Round of 16 will be played 30 May - 1 June 2017.

Quarter-finals
The Quarter-finals were played from 29 June to 3 July 2017.

Semi-finals

The Semi-finals were played 27–29 July 2017.

Final
The final was played on 12 August 2017.

Top goalscorers

References

External links

2017 in Icelandic football
2017 domestic association football cups
Icelandic Men's Football Cup